Pombas is a city in the northeastern part of the island of Santo Antão, Cape Verde. It is the seat of the municipality Paul. The national roads EN1-SA02 and EN1-SA03 connect Pombas with Ribeira Grande and Porto Novo, respectively. Pombas was elevated from town to city in 2010.

Demographics
1990: 1,161
2000: 1,796
2010: 1,295

See also
List of villages and settlements in Cape Verde

References

External links

Cities in Cape Verde
Paul, Cape Verde
Geography of Santo Antão, Cape Verde
Municipal seats in Cape Verde
Populated coastal places in Cape Verde